The was a multi-day severe weather and tornado outbreak impacted the Southeastern and Mid-Atlantic United States from February 5–7. A powerful upper-level trough progressed eastward across the country, intersecting an abundant supply of moist air to produce severe weather. An eastward-propagating cold front supported a damaging squall line across the Southeast U.S. on February 5–6; supercell thunderstorms ahead of this line also produced numerous tornadoes. One EF1 tornado in the pre-dawn hours of February 6 killed one person in Demopolis, Alabama. On the morning of February 7, a secondary front progressed across Maryland and Virginia, unexpectedly leading to hundreds of damaging wind reports across Virginia, Maryland, Delaware, New Jersey, New York, Connecticut, Rhode Island, and Massachusetts. Five tornadoes were reported in the Washington, D.C., area, the most on record for a wintertime severe weather event. Across the three-day outbreak, 37 tornadoes were confirmed, including several that were strong and long-tracked.

Meteorological synopsis
Rounding out the final day of January, the Storm Prediction Center (SPC) began highlighting the potential for a prolonged period of severe weather across the Southern United States in the extended range forecast. General 15% severe probabilities yielded to a Slight risk across portions of the central Gulf Coast region valid on February 5. This outlook underwent significant expansions northward on February 4, and an Enhanced risk was introduced from extreme northeast Louisiana into northwestern Alabama shortly before the beginning of the tornado outbreak; this area saw the strongest tornadoes.

On the morning of February 5, a major upper-level trough was progressing eastward across the Central United States, supporting broad southwesterly winds in advance of it. At the surface, a stationary front existed from northwestern Alabama into a low-pressure area over northern Louisiana, transitioning into a cold front southwestward into southeastern Texas. Despite high instability and favorable wind shear profiles, storms were initially slow to organize across Mississippi as widespread cloud cover prevented the northward progression of the warm sector and temperatures warmed aloft. This trend was only temporary, however, with an abrupt increase in tornadic activity throughout the afternoon hours. Numerous tornadoes occurred throughout Mississippi into Alabama, including several strong and long-tracked tornadoes. Into the overnight hours, southerly low-level winds continued to provide a moist environment, with dewpoints in the upper 60s °F. Storms intensified along an eastward-progressing cold front over Mississippi, aided by generally parallel wind shear profiles and cooling upper-level temperatures as the trough approached from the west. Ahead of the front, additional supercells formed and produced tornadoes, including an exceptionally long-lived EF2 tornado across Jasper, Clarke, and Lauderdale counties in Mississippi. An EF1 tornado southeast of Demopolis, Alabama, destroyed two manufactured homes, causing one death and one injury.

Throughout February 6, an Enhanced risk of severe weather existed across a large section of the Southeastern United States. Overnight severe thunderstorms in Mississippi and Alabama continued to persist and shift eastward throughout the early morning hours. Despite only modest instability across northeastern Georgia into central North Carolina, the presence of a very moist and strongly-sheared environment led to many more tornadoes, including two EF2 tornadoes in North Carolina south of Kings Mountain and east of Kannapolis. The line of strong to severe thunderstorms continued eastward throughout the afternoon of February 6, producing hundreds of damaging wind reports before shifting offshore. The next morning, following a brief reprieve in severe thunderstorm activity, the SPC outlined a Marginal risk across eastern Virginia and central Maryland. Here, a secondary front supported an intensifying line of thunderstorms in a low instability but high wind shear environment. In defiance of forecasts, this band of convection produced hundreds of damaging wind reports across the Mid-Atlantic over the course of four hours. In addition, five tornadoes were confirmed throughout the Washington, DC, area, making this the largest wintertime tornado outbreak on record there.

Confirmed tornadoes

February 5 event

February 6 event

February 7 event

See also
List of North American tornadoes and tornado outbreaks

Notes

References

2020 in Tennessee
2020 in Mississippi
2020 in Alabama
2020 in Georgia (U.S. state)
2020 in South Carolina
2020 in North Carolina
2020 in Maryland
Tornadoes in Tennessee
Tornadoes in Mississippi
Tornadoes in Alabama
Tornadoes in Georgia (U.S. state)
Tornadoes in South Carolina
Tornadoes in North Carolina
Tornadoes in Maryland
February 2020 events in the United States
2020 natural disasters in the United States
Tornadoes of 2020
F2 tornadoes
2020 in Virginia
Tornadoes in Virginia